Pterolophia pseudobscuroides is a species of beetle in the family Cerambycidae. It was described by Stephan von Breuning in 1938.

References

pseudobscuroides
Beetles described in 1938